The 42nd Infantry Division (42-ya Pekhotnaya Diviziya) was an infantry formation of the Russian Imperial Army.

Organization
The 42nd Infantry Division was part of the 9th Army Corps.
1st Brigade
165th Infantry Regiment
166th Infantry Regiment
2nd Brigade
167th Infantry Regiment
168th Infantry Regiment
42nd Artillery Brigade

Commanders
1907-1913: Nikolai Epanchin

References

Infantry divisions of the Russian Empire
Military units and formations disestablished in 1918